The Chicayán River is a river of Mexico.

See also
List of rivers of Mexico

References

The Prentice Hall American World Atlas, 1984.
Rand McNally, The New International Atlas, 1993.

Rivers of Mexico